How the West Was One may refer to:

 How the West Was One (Cali Agents album), 2000
 How the West Was One (2nd Chapter of Acts, Phil Keaggy and a band called David album), 1977
 How the West Was One (Carbon Leaf album), 2010

See also
 How the West Was Won (disambiguation)